French Rarebit is a 1951 Warner Bros. Merrie Melodies animated short, directed by Robert McKimson and written by Tedd Pierce. Released June 30, 1951, the cartoon features Bugs Bunny. The title is a takeoff on "Welsh rarebit", which is also known as "Welsh rabbit".

Plot
In Paris, France, after hitting a bumpy patch in the road, a delivery truck carrying several crates accidentally loses one marked "Carrots from U.S.A.".  Bugs Bunny was inside this crate and, as he sits in the road, surrounded by carrots, he tries to figure out where he is. He sees signs indicating the Rue de la Paix, the Champs-Élysées, and the Eiffel Tower, and realizes he is in Paris; he decides to "stroll down ze boulevard and look over the monsewers and mademoysels".

Two French chefs, Louis and François, spot Bugs at the same time and both decide to cook him as a dinner special for their respective restaurants. Bugs is initially unaware of what is going on when each chef secretly measures him, but catches on quickly and notices the two separately approaching him with a tureen at the ready.

François happily strides back to his restaurant, convinced he has captured the rabbit. Bugs meets him at the entrance and asks what the chef has in the "toureen". When François replies, Bugs asks if he can have a peek. "Hmm...sorta short-eared critter, ain't he, doc?" Bugs says when it is revealed that it is Louis inside. François demands to know what Louis has done with his rabbit. Louis corrects his rival, stating that the rabbit is his. Bugs steps in and stokes an uptick in the squabble by whispering in each of their ears suggestions as to what he would do in similar circumstances. As things escalate, Bugs whispers to the audience, "What a revolting display of temper."

François comes out on top, snatches Bugs and dumps him into a large pot on his stove. After the chef describes the meal he is going to prepare, Bugs suggests the best way to serve him would be "a good old Louisiana Back-bay Bayou Bunny Bordelaise, a la Antoine" from the famed Antoine's of New Orleans. François asks for the recipe, which Bugs refuses to provide, but when François "een-seests," Bugs decides to demonstrate it on him. He disguises François as a rabbit, dips him in wine, pickles him, and stuffs him full of every spicy ingredient in the kitchen (including "hot peppers, bay leaves, bay rum, horseradish, 'muleradish', and a dash of Tabasco sauce") before coating him in flour, dumping him into a stew pot and adding fresh vegetables.

Louis arrives and tells Bugs (thinking he is François) that the rabbit is his and proceeds to take the stew pot and all that is in it with him. François whacks Louis on the head with a mallet. Louis expresses surprise that this 'delicacy' in the pot is his counterpart.  François says "You were expecting maybe Humphrey Bogart?" (A catchphrase from The Fred Allen Show). Louis asks, "Monsieur François! Wha' Happa'?!" François tells him that Bugs knows the coveted recipe from the famous Antoine, inspiring Louis to demand that Bugs now show him the recipe. Bugs agrees and plays out the same food preparation routine; he then places the two of them into an oven (identified on the door as La Oven) with a carrot, which has a stick of dynamite in it.

After the dynamite explodes, the two goofy chefs, having survived the blast, jauntily sing Alouette, adding, with a cheer, "Vive Antoine!"  as they baste themselves.

As the cartoon closes, Bugs remarks, "Poi-sonally, I prefer hamboigah."

Home media
The short can be found (uncut) on the Looney Tunes Golden Collection: Volume 2.

References

External links 

 

1951 films
1951 animated films
1951 short films
Animated films set in Paris
Merrie Melodies short films
Films directed by Robert McKimson
Films scored by Eugene Poddany
Films scored by Milt Franklyn
Bugs Bunny films
1950s Warner Bros. animated short films
1950s English-language films
Films about chefs
Films set in restaurants